Le Club was a members-only restaurant and nightclub located at 416 East 55th Street in Manhattan. French expatriate Olivier Coquelin founded Le Club in 1960.

It was a playground for New York's elites, including the Vanderbilts and Kennedys.  As a young man in the 1970s, Donald Trump frequented the club, particularly associating with Roy Cohn.

References

Nightclubs in Manhattan
Donald Trump